In mathematics, a transition function may refer to:
 a transition map between two charts of an atlas of a manifold or other topological space
 the function that defines the transitions of a state transition system in computing, which may refer more specifically to a
 Turing machine,
 finite-state machine, or
 cellular automaton
 a stochastic kernel In statistics and probability theory, the conditional probability distribution function controlling the transitions of a stochastic process